Thomas Kessler (born 20 January 1986) is a German former professional footballer who played as a goalkeeper.

Club career
Kessler was born in Cologne. He made his debut for 1. FC Köln in the 2006–07 season in the 2. Bundesliga.

Kessler joined Bundesliga club FC St. Pauli on loan in June 2010. On 12 September 2010, he made his debut for FC St. Pauli in a league fixture against his former club, in Cologne.

International career
Kessler represented the Germany national under-16 football team once in 2002.

References

External links
 
 Thomas Kessler Interview

1986 births
Living people
German footballers
Footballers from Cologne
Association football goalkeepers
Germany youth international footballers
1. FC Köln players
1. FC Köln II players
FC St. Pauli players
Eintracht Frankfurt players
Bundesliga players
2. Bundesliga players
Regionalliga players